Jianshanopodia decora is a Cambrian lobopodian. Its frontal, grasping appendages bear wedge-shaped plates. Its limbs branch, instead of being tipped with claws as many lobopods' are. It has a sediment-filled gut surrounded by serially repeated diverticulae. It is thought to have sucked up prey with its short 'trunk'. It mainly crawled on the sea floor, but could swim when necessary.
Its mouth resembles those of anomalocaridids and priapulids.

References

Prehistoric protostome genera
Fossil taxa described in 2006
Lobopodia

Cambrian genus extinctions